The 1986 All-Ireland Senior Football Championship was the 100th staging of the All-Ireland Senior Football Championship, the Gaelic Athletic Association's premier inter-county Gaelic football tournament. The championship began on 18 May 1986 and ended on 21 September 1986.

Kerry entered the championship as the defending champions.

On 21 September 1986, Kerry won the championship following a 2–15 to 1–10 defeat of first-time finalists Tyrone in the All-Ireland final. This was their 30th All-Ireland title and their third championship in succession.

Down's Brendan Mason was the championship's top scorer with 3-18. Kerry's Pat Spillane was the choice for Texaco Footballer of the Year.

Results

Connacht Senior Football Championship

Quarter-finals

Semi-finals

 

Final

Leinster Senior Football Championship

Preliminary round

 
 

Quarter-finals

 
 

Semi-finals

Final

Munster Senior Football Championship

Quarter-finals

Semi-finals

Final

Ulster Senior Football Championship

Preliminary round

Quarter-finals

 
 

Semi-finals

Final

All-Ireland Senior Football Championship

Semi-finals

Final

Championship statistics

Scoring

Overall

Top scorers in a single game

Miscellaneous

 Meath win their first Leinster football title since 1970.
 After facing defeat in four previous All-Ireland semi-finals (1956, 1957, 1973, 1984), Tyrone's defeat of Galway at the penultimate stage allows the team to qualify for their very first All-Ireland final.
 Kerry's Pat Spillane, Páidí Ó Sé and Denis "Ógie" Moran became the first players in the history of the championship to win eight All-Ireland medals on the field of play. Mikey Sheehy also won an eighth All-Ireland medal, however, he missed the 1984 All-Ireland final through injury.
 The All Ireland final was the first meeting between Kerry and Tyrone.

References